James Hodge Codding (July 8, 1849 – September 12, 1919) was a Republican member of the U.S. House of Representatives from Pennsylvania.

James H. Codding was born in Pike Township, Bradford County, Pennsylvania.  He moved to Towanda, Pennsylvania, in 1854.  He attended the Susquehanna Collegiate Institute in Towanda and Dartmouth College in Hanover, New Hampshire.  He was engaged in the hardware business at Towanda in 1868.  He studied law, was admitted to the bar and commenced practice in Towanda in 1879.

Codding was elected as a Republican to the Fifty-fourth Congress to fill the vacancy caused by the death of Myron B. Wright.  He was reelected to the Fifty-fifth Congress.  He was not a candidate for reelection in 1898.  He resumed the practice of law in Towanda, and in 1903 moved to New York City.  He served as grand secretary general of the northern Masonic jurisdiction for the Scottish Rite bodies from 1902 until his death in Brooklyn, New York, in 1919.  Interment in Oak Hill Cemetery in Towanda, Pennsylvania.

Sources

The Political Graveyard

1849 births
1919 deaths
Dartmouth College alumni
Pennsylvania lawyers
People from Towanda, Pennsylvania
Republican Party members of the United States House of Representatives from Pennsylvania
19th-century American politicians
19th-century American lawyers